David Epston (born 30 August 1944) is a New Zealand therapist, co-director of the Family Therapy Centre in Auckland, New Zealand, Visiting Professor at the John F. Kennedy University, an honorary clinical lecturer in the Department of Social Work, University of Melbourne, and an affiliate faculty member in the Ph.D program in Couple and Family Therapy at North Dakota State University. Epston and his late friend and colleague Michael White are known as originators of narrative therapy.

Early life and education 
David Epston was born in 1944 in Peterborough, Ontario, Canada, where he grew up. He began studies at the University of British Columbia, and left Canada in 1963 when he was 19, arriving in New Zealand in 1964. He graduated with a BA degree in Sociology & Anthropology at Auckland University in 1969, going on to take a Diploma in Community Development at the University of Edinburgh, graduating in 1971. He graduated with an MA in Applied Social Studies from Warwick University, United Kingdom, in 1976, and received a Certificate of Qualification in Social Work (CQSW) in 1977.

Career in family therapy 
In New Zealand Epston started working as a senior social worker in an Auckland hospital. From 1981 to 1987 he worked as consultant family therapist at the Leslie Centre, run by Presbyterian Support Services in Auckland. From 1987 to the present he has been co-director of The Family Therapy Centre in Auckland.

In the late 1970s Epston and Michael White led the flowering of family therapy within Australia and New Zealand. Together they started developing their ideas, continuing during the 1980s, and eventually in 1990 published Narrative Means to Therapeutic Ends, the first major text in what came to be known as narrative therapy. In 1997 following the publication of Playful Approaches to Serious Problems Epston, along with his co-authors Dean Lobovits and Jennifer Freeman, initiated the website Narrative Approaches. It includes series of authored and co-authored papers, artwork, and poetry in the form of an "Archive of Resistance: Anti-Anorexia/anti-Bulimia."

Epston was awarded an honorary Doctor of Humane Letters (DLitt) in 1996 by the Graduate School of Professional Psychology, John F. Kennedy University, in Orinda, California, and the Special Award for Distinguished Contributions to Family Therapy from the Australian and New Zealand Journal of Family Therapy.

Publications 
 1989. Literate Means to Therapeutic Ends. With Michael White. Adelaide: Dulwich Centre Publications.
 1990. Narrative Means to Therapeutic Ends. With Michael White. W.W. Norton.
 1992. Experience, Contradiction, Narrative and Imagination: Selected papers of David Epston & Michael White, 1989-1991. With Michael White. Adelaide, South Australia: Dulwich Centre Publications.
 1997. Playful approaches to serious problems: narrative therapy with children and their families. With Jennifer Freeman and Dean Lobovits. W.W. Norton.
 2004. Biting the hand that starves you: inspiring resistance to anorexia/bulimia. With Richard Linn Maisel and Ali Borden. W.W. Norton.
 2008. Down under and up over: travels with narrative therapy. Edited by Barry Bowen. Karnac Books. 
 2016. Narrative Therapy in Wonderland: Connecting with Children’s Imaginative Know-How. With David Marsten. W. W. Norton & Company.
 2016. Re-imagining narrative therapy: A history for the future. Journal of Systemic Therapies, 35(1), 79–87.

References

External links 
 narrativeapproaches.com Remembrance of Michael White by David Epston.

Living people
1944 births
New Zealand psychologists
Psychotherapists
Family therapists
People from Auckland
University of Auckland alumni
Alumni of the University of Edinburgh
Alumni of the University of Warwick
John F. Kennedy University faculty